Earth: Voices of a Planet is an album released by Paul Winter in 1990. The album was a commissioned for the 20th anniversary of Earth Day, and was premiered in Times Square by the Paul Winter Consort and special guests. The album is a tribute to the Earth, and features at least one instrument or voice from every continent. The album also features animal calls woven into the music. In particular, recordings of elephant basso-rumbles are used. These sounds, created by elephants, are below 20 Hz, and therefore too low for the human ear to detect on its own, and their existence was unknown until shortly before the album was created.

The album was nominated for a Grammy award in 1991.

Track listing
 "Appalachian Morning" (Halley)
 "Cathedral Forest" (Halley)
 "Call Of The Elephant" (Dadey, Berliner, Halley, Winter)
 "Antarctica" (Halley, Winter)
 "Ocean Child" (Orca, Halley, Winter)
 "Uirapuru Do Amazonas" (De Mello, Thiago)
 "Talkabout" (Friesen, Winter, Landau, Turre)
 "Russian Girls" (Pokrovsky, Friesen, Halley, Winter, Landau)
 "Black Forest" (Winter)
 "Song Of The Exile" (De Mello, Thiago)
 "Under the Sun" (Velez, Clark, Halley, McCandless, Winter)
 "And The Earth Spins" (Halley)

Personnel
 Paul Winter – soprano saxophone
 Rhonda Larson – flute
 Paul McCandless – oboe
 Steve Turre – didjeridu
 Paul Halley – keyboards
 Eugene Friesen – cello
 Kenny Mazur – steel-string guitar
 Oscar Castro-Neves – guitar
 Thiago de Mello – voice, guitar, percussion
 Russ Landau – bass
 Paul Wertico – drums
 Kwaku Dadey – Ghanaian drums
 Paul Berliner – percussion
 Guilherme Franco – percussion
 Ted Moore – percussion
 Glen Velez – percussion
 Dmitri Pokrovsky Ensemble

References

"Earth: Voices Of A Planet." Living Music.

1990 albums
Living Music albums
Paul Winter albums